Glamour is a 2000 Hungarian film directed by Frigyes Gödrös. It was Hungary's submission to the 73rd Academy Awards for the Academy Award for Best Foreign Language Film, but was not accepted as a nominee.

See also

Cinema of Hungary
List of submissions to the 73rd Academy Awards for Best Foreign Language Film

References

External links

2000 films
2000 drama films
2000s Hungarian-language films
Hungarian drama films